Bataille is a surname. Notable people with the surname include:

Christian Bataille (born 1946), French politician
Frédéric Bataille (1850–1946), French educator, poet and mycologist
Georges Bataille (1897–1962), French intellectual and literary figure
Henri Jules Bataille (1816–1882), French general
Henry Bataille (1872–1922), French dramatist and poet
Laetitia Bataille, French journalist and writer
Laurence Bataille (1930–1986), French psychoanalyst and writer
Matthieu Bataille (born 1978), French judoka
Nicolas Bataille (1926–2008), French comedian and director
Sylvia Bataille (1908–1993), French actress